Final Accord or Final Chord (German: Schlußakkord) is a 1960 drama film directed by Wolfgang Liebeneiner and starring Christian Marquand, Eleonora Rossi Drago and Viktor de Kowa. It was made as a co-production between France, Italy and West Germany. It is a remake of the 1936 film of the same title by Douglas Sirk.

The film's sets were designed by the art directors Hertha Hareiter, Otto Pischinger and Wolf Witzemann. Location shooting took place around Salzburg, particularly at the Salzburg Festival.

Cast
 Christian Marquand as Frank Leroux
 Eleonora Rossi Drago as Linda Valore
 Mario Del Monaco as Carlo del Monti
 Viktor de Kowa as Alexander von Berkin
 Marion Michael as Jacqueline Petersen
 Christian Wolff as Freddy
 Adeline Wagner as Josefine Wendelin
 Hans Reiser as Vladya Dupont
 Ljuba Welitsch as Louise
 Rudolf Carl as 'Höllenstein'-Wirt
 Hannsgeorg Laubenthal as Robert Michaelis
 Fritz Lafontaine as 	Kellner
 Hans Thimig as 	Dr. Thimm, Chefarzt

References

Bibliography 
 Robert, Reimer, & Reimer, Carol. The A to Z of German Cinema. Scarecrow Press, 2010.

External links 
 

1960 films
West German films
German drama films
1960 drama films
French drama films
Italian drama films
1960s German-language films
Films directed by Wolfgang Liebeneiner
Gloria Film films
Remakes of German films
Films set in Salzburg
1960s German films
1960s Italian films
1960s French films